The seventeenth edition of the Caribbean Series (Serie del Caribe) was played in . It was held from February 1 through February 6 with the champions teams from Dominican Republic, Mexico and Puerto Rico, represented by the Tigres del Licey, Venados de Mazatlán and Criollos de Caguas, respectively. This time Venezuela did not participate in the tournament due to a players strike, being replaced by the second place team from the Mexican Pacific League, the Yaquis de Obregón. The format consisted of 12 games, each team facing the other teams twice, and the games were played in Hermosillo, Sonora, to become the first Caribbean Series held in Mexican baseball history.

Summary

Scoreboards

Game 1, February 1

Game 2, February 1

Game 3, February 2

Game 4, February 2

Game 5, February 3

Game 6, February 3

Game 7, February 4

Game 8, February 4

Game 9, February 5

Game 10, February 5

Game 11, February 6

Game 12, February 6

Sources
Antero Núñez, José. Series del Caribe. Impresos Urbina, Caracas, Venezuela.
Araujo Bojórquez, Alfonso. Series del Caribe: Narraciones y estadísticas, 1949-2001. Colegio de Bachilleres del Estado de Sinaloa, Mexico.
Figueredo, Jorge S. Cuban Baseball: A Statistical History, 1878–1961. Macfarland & Co., United States.
González Echevarría, Roberto. The Pride of Havana. Oxford University Express.
Gutiérrez, Daniel. Enciclopedia del Béisbol en Venezuela, Caracas, Venezuela.

External links
Las Series del Caribe (Spanish)
SoloBeisbol.com – Hermosillo 1974, la primera Serie del Caribe en México (Spanish)

Caribbean
Caribbean Series
International baseball competitions hosted by Mexico
1974 in Mexican sports
1974 in Caribbean sport
Caribbean Series